Ruthin was a rural district in the administrative county of Denbighshire from 1894 to 1974. 

The rural district was formed from the area of Ruthin Rural Sanitary District.

The district originally contained nineteen civil parishes:
Aberwheeler Rural
Clocaenog
Derwen
Efenechtid
Llanarmon-yn-Iâl			
Llanbedr Dyffryn Clwyd
Llandegla
Llandyrnog Rural
Llaneldian
Llanfair Dyffryn Clwyd Rural
Llanferres
Llanfwrog Rural
Llangwyfan
Llangynhafal
Llanrhaedr yng Nghinmeirch Rural
Llanrhydd Rural
Llanynys Rural
Nantglyn
Y Gyffilliog

A County Review Order in 1935 added the parish of Bryneglwys from the abolished Llangollen Rural District. At the same time a new parish of Llandyrnog was formed by the merger of Llandyrnog Rural and Llangwyfan, and Llangynhafal parish absorbed Llanhychan.	

Ruthin Rural District was abolished in 1974 by the Local Government Act 1972, becoming part of the district of Glyndŵr, in the new county of Clwyd.

Sources
Denbighshire Administrative County (Vision of Britain)

History of Denbighshire
Rural districts of Wales